José Salazar López (January 12, 1910 – July 9, 1991) was a Mexican Cardinal of the Roman Catholic Church. He served as Archbishop of Guadalajara from 1970 to 1987, and was elevated to the cardinalate in 1973.

Biography
Born in Ameca, Jalisco, José Salazar López studied at the seminary in Guadalajara and the Pontifical Gregorian University in Rome before being ordained to the priesthood on May 26, 1934. He then did pastoral work in Guadalajara until 1961. During this time, Salazar led the construction of the Conciliar Seminary of Guadalajara, where he later served as a professor and prefect of studies (1934-1944), vice-rector (1944-1950), and rector (1950-1961). He was made Apostolic Visitor to the seminaries in Puebla and Durango in 1958.

On May 22, 1961, Salazar was appointed Coadjutor Bishop of Zamora and Titular bishop of Prusias ad Hypium by Pope John XXIII. He received his episcopal consecration on the following August 20 from Cardinal José Garibi y Rivera, with Archbishop Francisco Nuño y Guerrero and Bishop José Anaya y Diez de Bonilla serving as co-consecrators. After attending the Second Vatican Council from 1962 to 1965, Salazar succeeded Anaya y Diez as Bishop of Zamora on September 15, 1967. He was later named Archbishop of Guadalajara on February 21, 1970.

Pope Paul VI created him Cardinal Priest of S. Emerenziana a Tor Fiorenza in the consistory of March 5, 1973. Salazar once served as President of the Mexican Episcopal Conference, and was one of the cardinal electors who participated in the conclaves of August and October 1978, which selected Popes John Paul I and John Paul II respectively. He resigned as Guadalajara's archbishop on May 15, 1987, and lost the right to participate in another conclave upon reaching age 80 on January 12, 1990.

The Cardinal died from a heart attack in Guadalajara, at the age of 81. He is buried in the metropolitan cathedral of the same city.

References

External links and additional sources
Cardinals of the Holy Roman Church
 (for Chronology of Bishops)
 (for Chronology of Bishops)

1910 births
1991 deaths
Mexican cardinals
20th-century Roman Catholic archbishops in Mexico
Participants in the Second Vatican Council
Roman Catholic archbishops of Guadalajara
Cardinals created by Pope Paul VI
People from Jalisco